Adnan Erkan (born 15 January 1968 in Denizli) is a Turkish retired footballer who played as a goalkeeper.

He played mostly for Ankaragücü and Denizlispor.

Erkan made one appearance for the senior Turkey national football team and was a participant at the 1996 UEFA European Championship.

References

1968 births
Living people
Turkish footballers
Turkey international footballers
UEFA Euro 1996 players
Association football goalkeepers
Konyaspor footballers
Denizlispor footballers
MKE Ankaragücü footballers
Turkey under-21 international footballers